Wally Dressel (June 3, 1893 – June 10, 1940) was a German freestyle swimmer, who competed in the 1912 Summer Olympics. She won a silver medal in relay together with her teammates Grete Rosenberg, Louise Otto and Hermine Stindt. In the 100 metre freestyle competition she was eliminated in the semi-finals.

References

External links
Waltraud Dressel's profile at Sports Reference.com

1893 births
1940 deaths
German female freestyle swimmers
German female swimmers
Olympic swimmers of Germany
Swimmers at the 1912 Summer Olympics
Olympic silver medalists for Germany
Medalists at the 1912 Summer Olympics
Olympic silver medalists in swimming